Ipswich Regent Theatre (formerly known as the Gaumont Theatre) is a theatre and concert venue located at St Helen's Street in Ipswich, Suffolk, England. The auditorium was refurbished in 2007 and now holds 1,551 people, having lost around 150 seats. It is East Anglia's largest theatre. It has also been known as the Gaumont Theatre. It was designated as a Grade II Listed Building in 2000.

History
The Regent Theatre opened in 1929 as a 'cine-variety hall' and was among the first UK theatres to play films with sound. Designed by WE Trent, it was extremely luxurious, with a restaurant, 14 boxes, a resident Wurlitzer organ and organist and an 18-piece orchestra. Unusually, a manager's cottage was incorporated into the theatre design.

During World War II the theatre was used to stage concerts and civic events, as well as ballet and opera. During the 1950s and 1960s it hosted many top acts, including Buddy Holly and the Crickets and The Beatles. Gene Pitney, The Hollies, The Small Faces, Roy Orbison, The Walker Brothers and Jimi Hendrix also played there.

In the 1970s and 1980s – when it was known as the Gaumont Theatre – it hosted many punk and new wave acts, including Ian Dury and The Blockheads, Elvis Costello, The Stranglers, Siouxsie and the Banshees, Gary Numan, and the Boomtown Rats. And as of 2021 Nick Cave and Warren Ellis

The theatre today
Ipswich Borough Council took the theatre on following controversy over its future, reopening it as Regent Theatre on 21 September 1991. It was given a Grade II listing in 2000. In 2009, the Regent Theatre celebrated its 80th birthday with a gala concert featuring Lesley Garrett and the Royal Philharmonic Orchestra.

References

External links
 Official Website
 Image of interior from Flickr
 360 Degree Virtual Tour

Theatres in Suffolk
Grade II listed buildings in Ipswich